Infinity Chamber (also known as somnio) is a 2016 American science fiction thriller film directed and written by Travis Milloy. It stars Christopher Soren Kelly, Cassandra Clark, Cajardo Lindsey and Jesse D. Arrow who interact with an artificial intelligence machine that manages a futuristic automated detention facility.

Plot 
A man named Frank, who apparently sabotaged a government operation with a computer virus, is held in a futuristic automated detention facility that is overseen by an artificial intelligence (AI) computer named Howard. Frank tries to escape and, due to the manipulation of his memories by the facility, relives recurrent dreams, mainly in a coffee shop with the owner Gabby, imagining that he has succeeded in escaping the facility, only to later realize that he has not.

Eventually Howard assists with Frank's escape, after realizing that he is breaking down and will eventually not be able to keep Frank alive anyway. Exiting out of the underground prison into a snow-covered wasteland, he is eventually rescued by two hikers. Frank learns that he was trapped in a black site and abandoned by the previous government and he is the only survivor, and various news organizations cover his escape.

Cast 

 Christopher Soren Kelly as Frank
 Cassandra Clark as Gabby/Madeline 
 Cajardo Lindsey as Fletcher
 Jesse D. Arrow as Howard

Reception 
Infinity Chamber won the Audience Award at the Fantastic Cinema Festival in 2016, and was a nominee at the Festival for Best Feature Film; the film was also a nominee for Best Feature Director at the Other Worlds Austin SciFi Film Festival in 2016.

According to film reviewer Greg Wheeler, "Infinity Chamber is an interestingly crafted futuristic sci-fi that manages ... to form a decent cerebral science fiction flick," although, the reviewer notes, the ending could have been better. David Duprey is generally favorably impressed and writes, "Infinity Chamber [is] a complex, ingenious Indie gem with plenty of tricks up its sleeve." and comments that the film is "Highly Recommended". Michael Rechtshaggen, film reviewer for The Los Angeles Times, considers the film to be "a claustrophobic, dystopian sci-fi thriller that plays ... mind games to ponderous effect" but, in the end, considers the film to be a bit repetitious and long. Infinity Chamber, according to reviewer Dave Taylor, "is okay as a lower budget sci-fi film" and is "Worth a watch".

See also 

 
 
 
 List of artificial intelligence films

References

External links 
 
 
 
 

2016 films
2010s science fiction thriller films
Films about artificial intelligence
2010s English-language films